Ključarovci pri Ljutomeru is a village in the Municipality of Križevci in northeastern Slovenia. The area is part of the traditional region of Styria and is now included in the Mura Statistical Region.

References

External links
Ključarovci pri Ljutomeru on Geopedia

Populated places in the Municipality of Križevci